The name Nari has been used to name four tropical cyclones in the northwestern Pacific Ocean. The name was contributed by the Republic of Korea and means lily.
 Typhoon Nari (2001) (T0116, 20W, Kiko) – approached Okinawa and struck Taiwan and China.
 Typhoon Nari (2007) (T0711, 12W, Falcon) – struck South Korea.
 Typhoon Nari (2013) (T1325, 24W, Santi) – struck Vietnam and the Philippines as a typhoon.
 Tropical Storm Nari (2019) (T1906, 07W)

Pacific typhoon set index articles